Tanoshi FC is a football team from Brunei. Sometimes it is known as Tanoshi FT. The club was founded in 2020.

History 
Before the cancellation of the 2020 Belait District League, KB FC was participating in the tournament. 

Liang Lumut Belait FC defeated Tanoshi FC during the first round of 2021 Belait District League.

See also 

 List of football clubs in Brunei

References

Association football clubs established in 2020
Football clubs in Brunei
Works association football teams